Thawanmichakna Kenkhrabada (English: When The Star Falls) is a 2002 Indian Meitei language film directed by Kishorekumar and produced by Tollo, Chan & Nimai. It stars Amarjeet Rajkumar and Huirem Seema in the lead roles. It is a family drama with slices of romance and tragedy. The film was released at Pratap Talkies, Imphal on 25 April 2002.

Synopsis
The film tells the love story of Jiten and Meera. Jiten is the son of a rich businessman Biren, while Meera is a disabled singer. Jiten falls in love with Meera when he visits his home state during his vacation. They get married, but when Jiten returns to Pune to complete his studies, Meera returns to her own home, being unable to bear the ill-treatment by her in-laws, which cause the death of her one and only grandmother. Meera then survives as a music teacher. Bira and his wife only understand lately that disability is a glorious gift of God only when their daughter Sandhya met with an accident. The film's climax is achieved when Jiten found Meera and are reunited after a long separation.

Cast
 Amarjeet Rajkumar as Jiten
 Huirem Seema as Meera
 Wangkhem Lalitkumar
 Meera
 Medha
 Arun
 Kishorekumar

Soundtrack
Sagolsem Tijendra composed the songs for the movie and Doneshwor Konsam, Birmani Heisnam, Rajen Yengkokpam, S. Premila wrote the lyrics.

References

Meitei-language films
2002 films